The Second Avenue Subway (internally referred to as the IND Second Avenue Line by the MTA and abbreviated to SAS) is a New York City Subway line that runs under Second Avenue on the East Side of Manhattan. The first phase of this new line, with three new stations on Manhattan's Upper East Side, opened on January 1, 2017. The full Second Avenue Line, if and when it will be funded, will be built in three more phases to eventually connect Harlem–125th Street in Harlem to Hanover Square in Lower Manhattan. The proposed full line would be  and 16 stations long, serve a projected 560,000 daily riders, and cost more than $17 billion.

The line was originally proposed in 1920 as part of a massive expansion of what would become the Independent Subway System (IND). In anticipation of the Second Avenue Subway being built to replace them, parallel elevated lines along Second Avenue and Third Avenue were demolished in 1942 and 1955, respectively, despite several factors causing plans for the Second Avenue Subway to be cancelled. Construction on the line finally began in 1972 as part of the Program for Action, but was halted in 1975 because of the city's fiscal crisis, leaving only a few short segments of tunnels completed. Work on the line restarted in April 2007 following the development of a financially secure construction plan. A , $6 billion second phase from 96th to 125th Streets is in planning .

Phase 1 is served by the Q train at all times and limited rush-hour N and R trains. Phase 2 will extend the line's northern terminus from 96th Street to Harlem–125th Street, and both the Q and limited N services will be extended to 125th Street. Phase 3 will extend the line south from 72nd Street to Houston Street in Manhattan's Lower East Side; upon completion, a new T train will serve the entire line from Harlem to Houston Street. Phase 4 will again extend the line south from Houston Street to Hanover Square, maintaining the T designation for the entire line. The T will be colored  since it will use the Second Avenue Line through Midtown Manhattan.

Extent and service
Services that use the Second Avenue Line through Midtown Manhattan are to be colored . The following services use part or all of the Second Avenue Line:

Phase 1
Phase 1 of the Second Avenue Line opened in January 2017 and runs under Manhattan's Second Avenue from 65th Street to 105th Street, with stations at 72nd Street, 86th Street, and 96th Street. It is double-tracked along its entire length, with tracks in parallel tubes bored by tunnel boring machines, and central island platforms at all stations. North of 96th Street, both tracks continue as storage tracks until they end at 105th Street.

As part of Phase 1, the Second Avenue Subway connects to the BMT Broadway Line using an existing connection via the 63rd Street Line. The Q, as well as limited rush-hour N and R, operates northward from 57th Street–Seventh Avenue on the Broadway Line, curving east under Central Park on the 63rd Street Line. Broadway Line trains then stop at Lexington Avenue–63rd Street with a cross-platform interchange to the  train before merging with the Second Avenue Line near 65th Street; this connection also connects to the Sixth Avenue Line allowing for trains from the Sixth Avenue line to access the Second Avenue Subway, though this connection has been unused in regular service . The northbound 63rd Street Connector track dips below the level of Phase 3's planned tunnels, providing for a future flying junction between the connector and the rest of the Second Avenue Line.

Plans for expansion
The long-term plans for the Second Avenue Subway involve digging  of new tunnels north to Harlem–125th Street in Harlem and south to Hanover Square in the Financial District of Lower Manhattan. The entire line would also be double-tracked, except for a tentatively four-tracked segment between 21st and 9th Streets, including the 14th Street station, with the outer two tracks used to store trains. After Phase 4 is completed, the residents of East Harlem and the Upper East Side will have mass transit service down both Second Avenue and Broadway to the Financial District (the latter via transfer to Broadway local trains), as well as across the Manhattan Bridge to Brooklyn via the Q train.

An additional two-track connection is planned at around 63rd Street that will connect the Lower Manhattan-bound tracks on the Second Avenue Line with the Queens-bound tracks on the IND 63rd Street Line, using existing bellmouths at 63rd Street and First Avenue. Current plans do not call for it to be used by regular service; instead, it would be used for moving out-of-service trains. The connection would allow for trains to run from the Financial District to Queens if the capacity of the IND Queens Boulevard Line were increased, or if the Queens Bypass were built. Service from Queens via the 63rd Street Tunnel would allow for the full capacity of the line south of 63rd Street to be used. The whole line will be designed to accommodate 30 trains per hour, with the exception of the terminal at Hanover Square, which will only be able to handle 26 trains per hour (TPH). The portion north of 63rd Street is planned to have 14 TPH on the Q and 14 TPH on the T, for a combined 28 trains per hour on both routes. South of there, only 14 TPH on the T are planned, although 12 additional TPH could be provided in the future via the 63rd Street Tunnel. The 2004 plans for the Second Avenue Subway include the construction of short track segments to allow a future extension north under Second Avenue past 125th Street to the Bronx, as well as an extension south to Brooklyn.

In order to store the 330 additional subway cars needed for the operation of the line, storage tracks would be built between 21st Street and 9th Street along the main alignment. The 36th–38th Street Yard in Sunset Park, Brooklyn, would also be reconfigured.

The Second Avenue Subway is chained as "S". The track map in the 2004 FEIS showed that all stations, except for 125th Street, would have two tracks and one island platform. 72nd Street and 125th Street were conceived as three-track, two-platform stations. 72nd Street was eventually scaled down to a two-track, center island platform station in order to reduce costs, A three-tracked 72nd Street station would have allowed trains from the Broadway Line to short-turn (reverse) without interfering with mainline service on Second Avenue, as well as provided additional operational flexibility for construction work and non-revenue moves. In July 2018, the 125th Street station was also scaled down to a two-track, one-platform station because the MTA had ascertained that two-tracked terminals would be sufficient to handle train capacities, and that building a third track would have caused unnecessary impacts to surrounding buildings.

History

Initial attempts

After World War I, the New York City Subway experienced a surge in ridership. By 1920, 1.3 billion annual passengers were riding the subway, compared to 523 million annual riders just seven years before the war. In 1919, the New York Public Service Commission launched a study at the behest of engineer Daniel L. Turner to determine what improvements were needed in the city's public transport system. Turner's final paper, titled Proposed Comprehensive Rapid Transit System, was a massive plan calling for new routes under almost every north-south Manhattan avenue, extensions to lines in Brooklyn and Queens, and several crossings of the Narrows to Staten Island. Among the plans was a massive trunk line under Second Avenue consisting of at least six tracks and numerous branches throughout Brooklyn, Queens, and the Bronx; in turn, the Second and Third Avenue elevated lines were to be knocked down to make room for the 6-track subway. The paper was revised in January 1927.

On September 15, 1929, the Board of Transportation of the City of New York (BOT) tentatively approved the expansion, which included a Second Avenue Line with a projected construction cost of $98.9 million (equivalent to $ in ), not counting land acquisition. In the north, several spur lines in the Bronx would merge into a four-track trunk line, crossing the Harlem River south to 125th Street. There would be six tracks from 125th Street to a link with the IND Sixth Avenue Line at 61st Street, then four tracks from 61st Street to Chambers Street, and finally two tracks from Chambers Street to Pine Street. But the Great Depression began that year and the soaring costs of the expansion became unmanageable. Construction on the first phase of the IND was already behind schedule, and the city and state were no longer able to provide funding. By 1930, the line was scaled down, with the line from 125th to Houston Streets to be complete by 1940, as well as a spur along 34th Street to be done by 1948. This scaled-down plan was postponed in 1931. By 1932, the Board of Transportation had modified the plan to further reduce costs, omitting a branch in the Bronx, and truncating the line's southern terminus to the Nassau Street Loop.

Further revision of the plan and more studies followed. By 1939, construction had been postponed indefinitely, with only a short length being completed above the Second Avenue station. The Second Avenue Line was relegated to "proposed" status, and was number 14 on the Board of Transportation's list of important transportation projects. The line was cut to two tracks with single northern branch through Throggs Neck, Bronx, a connection to the BMT Broadway Line in Manhattan, and a continuation south onto the IND Fulton Street Line in Brooklyn via that line's Court Street station. The subway's projected cost went up to US$249 million (equivalent to $ in ). The United States' entry into World War II in 1941 halted all but the most urgent public works projects, delaying the Second Avenue Line once again.

As part of the unification of the three subway companies that comprised the New York City Subway in 1940, elevated lines were being shut down all over the city and replaced by subways. The northern half of the Second Avenue Elevated, serving the Upper East Side and East Harlem, closed on June 11, 1940; the southern half, running through Lower Manhattan, East Midtown and across the Queensboro Bridge to Queens, closed on June 13, 1942. The demolition of the Second Avenue elevated caused overcrowding on the Astoria and Flushing Lines in Queens, which no longer had direct service to Manhattan's far East Side. The elevated line's closure, as well as a corresponding increase in the East Side's population, increased the need for a Second Avenue subway.

In 1944, BOT superintendent Philip E. Pheifer put forth a proposal for Second Avenue Subway services, which would branch extensively off to B Division. The subway was originally to be opened by 1951, but by 1945, plans for the Second Avenue Subway were again revised. Another plan was put forth in 1947 by Colonel Sidney H. Bingham, a city planner and former Interborough Rapid Transit Company (IRT) engineer. O'Dwyer and Gross believed that construction of a Second Avenue subway line would be vital to both increasing capacity on existing lines and allowing new branch lines to be built. Bingham's proposal involved more branch lines and track connections than did Phiefer's, and similar to the 1960s and 1990s phased proposals, was to be built in sections. However, by the next year, New York City was short $145 million that was needed for an $800 million program for rehabilitation and proposed capital improvements. The City petitioned the New York State Legislature to exceed its $655 million debt ceiling so that the city could spend $500 million on subway construction, but this request was denied.

The BOT then ordered ten new prototype subway cars made of stainless steel from the Budd Company. These R11 cars, so called because of their contract number, were delivered in 1949 and specifically intended for the Second Avenue Subway. They cost US$100,000 (equivalent to $ in ) each; the train became known as the "million dollar train". The cars featured porthole style round windows and a new public address system. Reflecting public health concerns of the day, especially regarding polio, the R11 cars were equipped with electrostatic air filters and ultraviolet lamps in their ventilation systems to kill germs.

In 1949, Queens and Lower Manhattan residents complained that the Second Avenue Subway would not create better transit options for them. A year later, a revised plan was devised that involved connections from Queens. New York voters approved a bond measure for its construction in 1951, and the city was barely able to raise the requisite $559 million for the construction effort. However, the onset of the Korean War caused soaring prices for construction materials and saw the beginning of massive inflation. Money from the 1951 bond measure was diverted to buy new cars, lengthen platforms, and maintain other parts of the aging New York City Subway system. Out of a half-billion-dollar bond measure, only $112 million (equivalent to $ in ), or 22% of the original amount, went toward the Second Avenue Subway. By then, construction was due to start by either 1952 or 1957, with estimated completion by 1958 at the earliest.

The Third Avenue Elevated, the only other elevated line in the area, closed on May 13, 1955, and was demolished in 1956. The Lexington Avenue Line was now the only subway transportation option on the East Side, leading to overcrowding. By 1957, the 1951 bond issue had been almost entirely used for other projects, and The New York Times despaired of the line's ever being built. "It certainly will cost more than $500 million and will require a new bond issue", wrote one reporter.

1970s construction 

As the early 1960s progressed, the East Side experienced an increase in development, and the Lexington Avenue Line became overcrowded. In 1962, construction began on a connection between the Manhattan and Williamsburg Bridges and the Sixth Avenue Line. This segment, the Chrystie Street Connection, was first proposed in the 1947 plan as the southern end of the Second Avenue line, which would feed into the two bridges. When opened in November 1967, the connection included the new Grand Street station on the Sixth Avenue Line (another station, 57th Street, opened in July 1968), and introduced the most significant service changes ever carried out in the subway's history. Grand Street, located under Chrystie Street (the southern end of Second Avenue) was designed to include cross-platform transfers between the Sixth Avenue and Second Avenue Lines.

Separately, in 1967, voters approved a $ (worth about $ in current dollars) Transportation Bond Issue, which provided over $ (worth $ today) for New York City projects, including for a 1968 Program for Action. The City secured a $25 million Urban Mass Transportation Act (UMTA) grant for initial construction. The Program for Action proposed a Second Avenue line to be built in two phases: a first phase north of 34th Street and a second phase south of there. The Second Avenue project, for a line from 34th Street to the Bronx, was given top priority.  However, the line's planned stops in Manhattan, spaced farther apart than those on existing subway lines, proved controversial; the Second Avenue line was criticized as a "rich man's express, circumventing the Lower East Side with its complexes of high-rise low- and middle-income housing and slums in favor of a silk stocking route." In response to protests, the MTA added stations at 72nd Street and 96th Street The MTA issued a plan for a spur line, called the "cuphandle", to serve the heart of the Lower East Side. Branching off from the IND Sixth Avenue Line near the Second Avenue station, the spur would run east on Houston Street, turn north on Avenue C, and turn west on 14th Street, connecting to the BMT Canarsie Line.

A combination of Federal and State funding was obtained for the project. In March 1972, the entire cost of the section between 34th Street and 126th Street, according to the project's Draft Environmental Study, was estimated to be $381 million. In June 1972, it was announced that UMTA would grant $25 million for the construction of this section of the line. The MTA had requested $254 million in federal funds for the northern part of the line. Preliminary estimates of the cost of the southern portion of the line came to $450 million.

Construction on a tunnel segment between 99th and 105th Streets began in October 1972.  A second segment between 110th and 120th Street in East Harlem started construction in March 1973. On October 25, 1973, the line's Chinatown segment commenced construction at Canal Street under the foot of the Manhattan Bridge between Canal and Division Streets. A fourth segment started construction on July 25, 1974, between Second and Ninth Streets in the East Village. In total, construction on the Second Avenue Line during the 1970s spanned over 27 blocks.

The city soon experienced its most dire fiscal crisis yet, due to the stagnant economy of the early 1970s, combined with the massive outflow of city residents to the suburbs. The system was already in decline; the subway had seen a 40% decrease in ridership since 1947, and a $200 million subsidy for the MTA as well as a 1952 fare increase had not been enough to pay for basic upkeep for the subway system, let alone fund massive expansion projects like the Second Avenue Subway. When plans were finalized in 1971, the subway had been proposed for completion by 1980, but two years later, its completion date was forecast as 2000. In October 1974, the MTA chairman, David Yunich, announced that the completion of the line north of 42nd Street was pushed back to 1983 and the portion to the south in 1988. On December 13, 1974, New York City mayor Abraham Beame proposed a six-year transit construction program that would reallocate $5.1 billion of funding from the Second Avenue Line to complete new lines in Queens and to modernize the existing infrastructure, which was rapidly deteriorating and in dire need of repair. Beame issued a stop-work order for the line in September 1975, whereupon construction of the section between Second and Ninth Streets was halted, and no other funding was allocated to the line's construction. Besides the Chrystie Street Connection, only three sections of tunnel had been completed; these tunnels were sealed.

By 1978, when the New York City Subway was at its lowest point in its existence, State Comptroller Arthur Levitt stated that there were no plans to finish the line. During the 1980s, plans for the Second Avenue line stagnated. Construction on the 63rd Street Lines continued; the IND portion of the line opened in 1989 and extended to 21st Street–Queensbridge in Long Island City, Queens, but it did not include a connection to the Second Avenue line. Of this failure to complete construction, Gene Russianoff, an advocate for subway riders since 1981, stated: "It's the most famous thing that's never been built in New York City, so everyone is skeptical and rightly so. It's much-promised and never delivered."

1990s plans

With the city's economic and budgetary recovery in the 1990s, there was a revival of efforts to complete construction of the SAS. Rising ridership on the IRT Lexington Avenue Line, the only subway trunk line east of Central Park, demonstrated the need for the Second Avenue Line, as capacity and safety concerns rose. The four-track IRT Lexington Avenue Line, the lone rapid transit option in the Upper East Side and East Harlem since the 1955 closure of the Third Avenue elevated, is the most crowded subway line in the country. The line saw an average of 1.3 million daily riders in 2015; this is more than the daily ridership of the second-busiest subway system in the U.S., the Washington Metro, as well as more than the combined daily riderships of San Francisco's and Boston's transit systems. Local bus routes are just as crowded during various times of the day, with the parallel M15 local and M15 Select Bus Service routes seeing 46,000 passengers per weekday in 2016, translating to 14.5 million passengers that year.

In 1991, then-New York Governor Mario Cuomo allocated $22 million to renew planning and design efforts for the Second Avenue line, but two years later, the MTA, facing budget cuts, removed these funds from its capital budget. In 1995, the MTA began its Manhattan East Side Alternatives (MESA) study, both a MIS and a DEIS, seeking ways to alleviate overcrowding on the Lexington Avenue Line and improve mobility on Manhattan's East Side. The study analyzed several alternatives, such as improvements to the Lexington Avenue Line to increase capacity, enhanced bus service with dedicated lanes, and light rail or ferry service on the East Side. Second Avenue was chosen over First Avenue for logistical reasons. The MTA started the Lower Manhattan Access Study (LMA) in November 1997 in order to determine the best new transport connections to the New York City suburbs. The construction of the Second Avenue Subway from 63rd Street to Lower Manhattan was one of the five building alternatives developed by the study.

A 1999 DEIS only proposed new subway service from 63rd Street north up Second Avenue to 125th Street via the Broadway Line to Lower Manhattan, with local and express tracks being switched on the Broadway Line. Second Avenue express trains would run to Lower Manhattan via the Montague Street Tunnel and local trains would run via the Manhattan Bridge and skip Lower Manhattan. A spur to Grand Central Terminal was considered, but later dropped due to its infeasibility.

Due in part to strong public support, the MTA Board committed in April 2000 to building a full-length subway line along the East Side, from East Harlem to Lower Manhattan. In May 2000, the MTA Capital Program Review Board approved the MTA's 2000–2004 Capital Program, which allocated $1.05 billion for the construction of the Second Avenue Subway. The next year, a contract for subway design was awarded to DMJM Harris/Arup Joint Venture. A new draft statement proposed the full-length line from 125th to 14th Streets. South of 14th Street, the line could either travel under Chrystie Street, St. James Place and Water Street to a terminal in Lower Manhattan, or link to the existing Nassau Street Loop tracks J1 and J2 at Kenmare Street to provide access to Lower Manhattan. The Water Street option was the one eventually chosen.

On December 19, 2001, the Federal Transit Administration approved the start of preliminary engineering on a full-length Second Avenue Subway. The MTA's final environmental impact statement (FEIS) was approved in April 2004; this latest proposal is for a two-track line from 125th Street and Lexington Avenue in Harlem, down Second Avenue to Hanover Square in the Financial District. The final plan called for the full-length Second Avenue line to carry two services: the T, with a route emblem colored , as well as a rerouted Q train. Phase 1 rerouted the Q, the Broadway Express via the BMT 63rd Street Line and north along Second Avenue, to the Upper East Side at 96th Street. Phase 2 will extend the rerouted Q train to 125th Street and Lexington Avenue. In Phase Three, the new T train will run from 125th Street to Houston Street. The final phase will extend T train service from Houston Street to Hanover Square in Lower Manhattan.

The  first phase was built within budget, at $4.45 billion. Its construction site was designated as being from 105th Street and Second Avenue to 63rd Street and Third Avenue. Deep bore tunneling methods were to be used in order to avoid the disruptions for road traffic, pedestrians, utilities and local businesses produced by cut-and-cover methods of past generations. Stations were to retain cut-and-cover construction. The total cost of the  line is expected to exceed $17 billion. In 2014, MTA Capital Construction President Dr. Michael Horodniceanu stated that the whole line may be completed as early as 2029, and would serve 560,000 daily passengers upon completion; however, only Phases 1 and 2 would be completed by 2029. The line is described as the New York City Subway's "first major expansion" in more than a half-century. It would add two tracks to fill the gap that has existed since the elevated Second and Third Avenue Lines were demolished in the 1950s. According to the line's final environmental impact statement, the catchment area of the line's first phase would include 200,000 daily riders.

Phase 1 construction
New York voters passed a transportation bond issue on November 8, 2005, allowing for dedicated funding allocated for that phase. Its passage had been seen as critical to its construction, but the bond was passed only by a narrow margin, with 55% of voters approving and 45% disapproving. At the time, the MTA said that the project would be done in 2012 in case the city's 2012 Summer Olympics bid succeeded, which it had not. On December 18, 2006, the United States Department of Transportation (USDOT) announced that they would allow the MTA to commit up to $693 million in funds to begin construction of the Second Avenue Subway and that the federal share of such costs would be reimbursed with FTA transit funds, subject to appropriations and final labor certification. The USDOT also later gave $1.3 billion in federal funding for the project's first phase, to be funded over a seven-year period. Preliminary engineering and a final tunnel design was completed by a joint venture between AECOM and Arup.

On March 20, 2007, upon completion of preliminary engineering, the MTA awarded a contract for constructing the tunnels, a launch box for the tunnel boring machine (TBM), and access shafts to S3, a joint venture of Schiavone Construction, Skanska USA Civil, and J.F. Shea Construction. A ceremonial groundbreaking took place on April 12, 2007, at the 99th Street tunnel segment built in the 1970s. Actual construction work began on April 23, 2007, with the relocation of utility pipes, wires, and other infrastructure, which took 14 months.

At the time, it was announced that passengers would be able to ride trains on the new line by the end of 2013.  Due to cost increases, several features of the subway were cut back soon after construction started. Notably, the 72nd Street Station was truncated from a three-track, two-platform design to a two-track, single island platform design, paired with a simplification of the connection to the Broadway Line spur. This design change was done before the actual construction started. The MTA also postponed its completion date to 2014. In its 2008 capital improvement budget proposal, the MTA further postponed completion of Phase 1 to 2015, and in 2009, the MTA rescheduled it again to 2016.

In 2009, contracts were awarded for the 96th Street station box, as well as for excavation around the 86th Street stations. The TBM began boring the western tunnel southward from 96th Street in 2010. Subsequent contracts for tunnels to the Lexington Avenue–63rd Street station, and for the excavation of the 72nd Street station, were awarded in 2010. The following year, contracts were awarded for excavation of the cavern at the 86th Street station, as well as construction for the Lexington Avenue–63rd Street station. The portion of the west tunnel remaining to be created was then mined using conventional drill-and-blast methods. On September 22, 2011, the TBM completed its run to the Lexington Avenue–63rd Street station's bellmouth.

The MTA opened a Second Avenue Subway Community Information Center for Phase 1 on July 25, 2013. It was located at 1628 Second Avenue between 84th and 85th Streets, near the line's 86th Street station. In the three years that followed, the center was visited over 20,000 times.

The final contract for the entire Phase 1 area was awarded on June 1, 2013.  Blasting for the station caverns was finished in November 2013, and the muck houses were taken down at around the same time.  In the winter of 2013, many of the tracks and signal panels began to arrive at the construction site, to be installed on the line over the next few years.

On February 24, 2016, the MTA allocated $66 million to speed up the construction of the first phase so that it could open in December. However, by June, the project was not being built at a rate that would allow a December 2016 completion. Concerns about the line's timely opening persisted through October and November, with key systems such as elevators, escalators, and fire alarms not having been tested. Test trains started running on October 9, 2016, and out-of-service Q trains started running through the subway in November 2016.

The entrance to the Lexington Avenue–63rd Street station at Third Avenue, which was completed as part of Phase 1, opened on December 30, 2016. The ceremonial first train, with several prominent officials in attendance, ran on New Year's Eve, and trains began serving the line in regular passenger service at noon the next day. About 48,200 passengers entered the new stations on January 1, excluding passengers who toured the line by entering at a station in the rest of the system.

Because of the opening of Phase 1, ridership on the Lexington Avenue Line at the 68th Street, 77th Street, 86th Street, and 96th Street stations decreased in January 2017 compared to January 2016. The Second Avenue Line's three stations and the renovated Lexington Avenue–63rd Street station saw an average weekday ridership of more than 150,000 by the end of January. The 72nd Street station was the busiest of the line's new stations, with an average daily ridership of 44,000. By April, taxi usage in the area also saw a decline of more than 20% compared to before the line's opening. By February 2018, there were 190,000 riders per weekday, within the 5% margin of error for the 200,000-daily-rider estimate given in the Environmental Impact Statement. Rush-hour ridership was within 2% of projections. In November 2017, because of the increasing demand, Q service was increased by one trip during each rush hour, and one northbound R trip was rerouted from the IND Queens Boulevard Line to further boost service. This trip returns southbound in Q service.

Phase 2 construction

The second phase, between 125th and 96th Streets, was allocated $535 million in the MTA's 2015–2019 Capital Plan for planning, design, environmental studies and utility relocation. Three new stations will be constructed at 125th Street, 116th Street and 106th Street. A transfer to the Lexington Avenue Line and an intermodal connection with Metro-North Railroad would be available at the Harlem–125th Street station.

The original plan called for the main line to turn west onto 125th Street with tail tracks to Fifth Avenue, while tail tracks would continue north on a spur via Second Avenue to 129th Street. However, the tail tracks to 129th Street, as well as a proposed ancillary building at 127th Street and Second Avenue, were removed in a June 2018 update to the plans. The change in tail tracks was made because it was found that providing tail tracks at the line's terminal will more efficiently facilitate subway service. A bellmouth provision for extension to the Bronx remains, though shifted closer to the 116th Street station at 118th Street. Here, two outer tracks will head west toward 125th Street while space for two inner tracks will allow for an extension to the Bronx. North of 120th Street, the line will be constructed through the use of TBMs. South of 120th Street, the line will utilize the 99th–105th and 110th–120th Streets tunnel sections built during the 1970s, with a cut-and-cover tunnel connecting the segments between 105th and 110th Streets.

The Phase 2 budget was originally $1.5 billion, which would be used to start construction of the tunnels; the MTA reduced the amount of money allocated in the budget, projecting that the agency would not be able to start construction by the end of the 5-year cycle in 2019. Although the MTA previously expressed concerns about funding the Capital Program, a spokesman stated that the reduction in funding was a result of uncertain timing and not money problems. The delay had upset politicians and residents of East Harlem, who objected to the 3-to-4-year delay. In April 2016, the MTA and the State of New York reached a deal to restore funding to Phase 2, with a total of $1.035 billion allocated; this budget was raised by $700 million in May 2017. By August 2017, preliminary work on the line was underway, and design of the project was being performed by Phase 2 Partnership, a joint venture of Parsons-Brinckerhoff and STV. The EIS and design were finished in 2018. In July 2018, the MTA published a Supplemental Environmental Assessment for the SAS FEIS. The FTA issued a Finding of No Significant Impact for the project on November 15, 2018.

A Second Avenue Subway Community Information Center for Phase 2, along 125th Street between Park and Madison Avenues, opened on September 18, 2017, delayed by four months. With the election of Joe Biden as U.S. president in 2021, the administration of Joe Biden approved $23 billion in funding for new transit projects across the United States that November, including Phase 2 of the Second Avenue Subway. Land acquisition for Phase 2 started in April 2022.

Phases 3 and 4 
Phase 3, which has no funding commitments, would extend the line southward along Second Avenue from 63rd Street to Houston Street. Upon its completion, a new service will operate running between 125th and Houston Streets. Phases 2 and 3, classified as a high-priority project by the Trump administration, may cost up to a combined total of $14.2 billion.

Phase 4, which also has no funding commitments, will provide an extension from Houston Street to a permanent terminus, with storage tracks, at Hanover Square. The Hanover Square terminal is only planned to be able to turn back 26 trains per hour instead of 30 as less capacity will be needed on the line south of 63rd Street. The Hanover Square station will be deep enough to allow for the potential extension of Second Avenue Subway service to Brooklyn through a new tunnel under the East River.

Design and cost

Features
The stations on the line were built so that they are more wide open than most other underground subway stations in the system; because of this, Horodniceanu likened the Second Avenue Subway stations to the stations on the Washington Metro. All stations on the line feature  platforms, with  overall lengths to provide space for power stations and ventilation plants. Tracks are built on rubber pads, which reduces noise from trains.

In early plans, the Second Avenue Subway was also to have platform screen doors to assist with air-cooling, energy savings, ventilation, and track safety, but this plan was scrapped in 2012 as cost-prohibitive. Stations constructed as part of Phase 2 may receive platform screen doors depending on the results of studies being conducted for their installation elsewhere.

Construction methods 
About 90% of the tunneling is to be performed by tunnel boring machines. The rest will be done using the cut-and-cover method, or through the use of mined drill-and-blast, for sections averaging  in length, namely the station boxes. The methods used to construct the sections of the line were confirmed in 2003, with a modification of the section north of 120th Street announced in 2016.

Phase 1 
Phase 1 of the Second Avenue Subway was constructed between the Lexington Avenue–63rd Street station on the 63rd Street Lines and an existing tunnel segment between 99th Street and 105th Street, with a terminal station at 96th Street. In Phase 1, tunneling was completed between East 63rd Street and East 92nd Streets through the use of TBMs. Two access shafts were constructed for the 72nd Street station. Since the rock is shallower between East 91st and 93rd Streets,  secant piles did the same work at shallower depths. Earth excavation was conducted between walls once they were installed, and box structures were built using a bottom-up construction method. Temporary decking constituted the top of the boxes, and the decking both braced the excavation and supported the walls and Second Avenue traffic.

The stations at 86th and 72nd Streets were mined. This was challenging, given the number of expensive high rise properties in their vicinities. The construction method that was used was supposed to ease concerns for buildings above the station sites, because only two shafts were required for excavation.

Of the below-ground obstacles, Arup director of construction David Caiden stated: "It's a spaghetti of tunnels, utilities, pipes and cables—I've never seen anything like it." Complicating the process, the project must go over, or under, subway lines, Amtrak railway lines, and the Queens-Midtown Tunnel linking Manhattan and Queens, in later phases. In addition, there were geological anomalies along the way of Phase 1. Manhattan's geology changes along the subway's length, passing through rock and soft ground, consisting of sands, silts, and clays over Manhattan schist, and there are faults and shear zones as well as fractured rock. The tunnels near the 125th Street station would need to go through soft soil in addition to diving underneath the existing IRT Lexington Avenue Line. The soft-soil tunnels are in contrast to the hard-rock bored tunnels south of 92nd Street and the cut-and-cover tunnels north of that point (necessitated because Manhattan's rock profile drops sharply north of 92nd Street).

Phase 2 
Phase 2 will extend the line north from the 96th Street station to the Harlem–125th Street subway station at Lexington Avenue. North of 120th Street, it will be constructed through the use of TBMs. The TBM Launch Box will be located between 121st Street and 122nd Street on Second Avenue. The line is designed as to not preclude the construction of a station at Lenox Avenue and the extension of the line west along 125th Street.

South of 120th Street, the line will utilize a tunnel section built during the 1970s, located between 110th Street and 120th Street. This section will have tracks and other essential equipment installed, like that of the rest of the line. Cut-and-cover will be used to connect the existing tunnel section to the bored section to the north (at 120th Street) and to the portion of the line already in operation to the south (at 105th Street) to maximize the use of the tunnel sections built in the 1970s. A bellmouth will be constructed to allow for a future extension to the Bronx at 118th Street. The storage tracks west of the 125th Street station would replace the storage tracks north of the 96th Street station, which would then be used in revenue service as part of Phase 2.

A transfer will be constructed at the eastern end of the Second Avenue Subway's Harlem–125th Street station to connect to the IRT Lexington Avenue Line's 125th Street station. A new lower-level mezzanine will house the connection between the two stations, directly connecting to the downtown platform for Lexington Avenue service. The direct connection to the staircases to the upper level will be rebuilt. At the western end of the station, staircases will lead to Park Avenue, allowing passengers to walk to the Metro-North Railroad's Harlem–125th Street station.

The station entrances for 106th Street and 116th Street will be located on the east side of Second Avenue so as to avoid utilities located on the west side of the street and to avoid potential adverse effects to the East Harlem Historic District.

Phases 3 and 4 
Phases 3 and 4 will extend the line south from 63rd Street to Houston Street and Hanover Square, respectively. As part of Phase 3, a connection to the IND 63rd Street Line would be built, allowing for non-revenue moves into Queens. This connection will be constructed through underground drilling and blasting. Bellmouths already exist for this connection east of the Lexington Avenue–63rd Street station. This section, like the rest of the line, will mainly consist of a two-track line. However, between 21st Street and 9th Street, two additional tracks will be constructed on either side of the main alignment to allow for the storage of eight trains. This location was selected due to the sufficient depth of the area. The third phase would pass above several East River tunnels, including the 63rd Street Tunnel, the 60th Street Tunnel, the 53rd Street Tunnel, the Steinway Tunnel at 42nd Street, and the East River Tunnels at 32nd and 33rd Streets.

Like Phase 1, the sections between stations will largely be constructed through the use of TBMs, while stations will be constructed through cut-and-cover and mining, allowing for the construction of station caverns, shafts, and entrances. Five transfers are planned to connect stations on the Second Avenue Line and nearby stations on adjacent lines, increasing travel options for passengers. The transfer at Grand Street will require the construction of a mezzanine below the existing station, allowing for a vertical transfer to be constructed. The existing station will have to be rebuilt to accommodate the increased volume of passengers using the station. The Houston Street station's transfer to the Second Avenue station of the IND Sixth Avenue Line would require some construction within the existing station. The remaining three transfers are being proposed, and will be constructed, barring the increased cost of their construction. The most complicated of the transfers will be the connection between the 42nd Street station and the Grand Central station on the IRT Flushing Line. To allow for the connection to be built, a 900-foot long tunnel would be built under 42nd Street from the west side of Third Avenue to Second Avenue. The Flushing Line station might have to be significantly reconstructed in anticipation of the increased volume of passengers and due to Americans with Disabilities Access requirements for the transfer. To allow for necessary vents and emergency exits to be built, cut-and-cover would be used. The final transfer would be between the 55th Street station and the Lexington Avenue–53rd Street station on the IND Queens Boulevard Line. Either shielded mining or cut-and-cover would be used to complete the connection. The existing station would have to be modified to allow for the transfer passageway to be built.

Three construction options were evaluated during the project's Environmental Impact Study for the portion of the line between 11th Street and Hanover Square. One option known as the Shallow Chrystie Option would mainly use cut and cover, while the Deep Chrystie Street and Forsyth Options would use a combination of tunneling by Earth Pressure Balance Machines (EPBMs) and cut and cover. The Shallow Chrystie Option would have used the existing Confucius Plaza tunnel section between Canal and Division Streets, and like the plan from the 1970s, there would have been a cross-platform transfer to the existing Grand Street station, with the transfer expected to be heavily used. However, this option would require digging up Sara Delano Roosevelt Park to the east as Chrystie Street is not wide enough to fit four tracks. Under this option, a track connection would be built to allow trains from Second Avenue to run via the Manhattan Bridge north tracks to allow service to Brooklyn. The Forsyth Option would curve below the park to Forsyth Street and the station would be built under Forsyth Street, requiring a 200-foot transfer passageway that would be less convenient than the other options. The Deep Chrystie Option would have the Second Avenue Subway run deeper underground, running underneath the existing Grand Street station, with a mezzanine in between the two stations. In order to allow for sufficient room for stairways to transfer to the Second Avenue Line, the Grand Street station would be widened to have twenty foot wide platforms. No track connection would be built under this option, and the Confucius Plaza tunnel section would not be used for subway service, but it instead might be used for ancillary subway facilities. Currently, this is the preferred option.

South of the terminal at Hanover Square, two tail tracks will be constructed through the use of a TBM to allow for the storage of four trains. The tracks would be built at a depth of about  under Water Street, allowing the line to be deep enough to tunnel under the East River for a possible future extension into Brooklyn. Cut-and-cover would be used to build a vent facility at a traffic island located at Water and Whitehall Streets.

Cost 
There was controversy over the high cost of the line as a whole. The project was divided up into four phases, in part, to maximize the ability of the project to receive funding from the Federal Government as part of the Department of Transportation's New Starts Program. The initial projections for the cost of the line were made in the 2004 FEIS, with Phase 1 estimated to cost $3.8 billion, Phase 2 estimated to cost $3.4 billion, and Phases 3 and 4 each estimated to cost $4.8 billion.

Phase 1 ended up costing $500 million over its original budget of $3.8 billion—still a very high price compared to other new subway systems worldwide. Regulations set by the Buy America Act forced the MTA to purchase materials made in the United States, which led to objections when an MTA contractor bought a fire suppression system made in Finland. Finally, the private and public sector could not cooperate smoothly on the project, further raising costs. Of the $4.5 billion cost for Phase 1, $2.4 billion was allocated to building the three new stations and renovating the Lexington Avenue–63rd Street station. Meanwhile, $500 million was spent on design and engineering, and another $734 million was for building tunnels between the stations, tracks, signals, and trackside systems. The rest of the cost, $800 million, was spent on "construction management, real estate, station artwork, fare-collection systems and other sundry items." The stations' cost was magnified by the depth of the stations and the enormity of the caverns that needed to be excavated. The Second Avenue Subway stations have full-length mezzanines, like the original IND but unlike other deep-level projects such as London's Crossrail. The stations will have full-length mezzanines as opposed to smaller mezzanines for each entrance to accommodate anticipated ridership for the full-length line and to comply with emergency egress requirements.

In December 2016, after it was announced that Phase 2 might cost $6 billion, transit experts expressed concern that the Second Avenue Subway might be so excessively costly as to preclude construction of Phases 3 and 4, as well as future expansions. One expert stated that the Phase 1 project was the most expensive subway project in the world, and that compared to other subway systems around the world, the cost of building new subways in New York City was much higher. The Second Avenue Subway's per-mile construction cost is higher than that of other projects in similar cities like London's Crossrail and Paris's Grand Paris Express, which themselves are among the most expensive underground-railway projects in the world. MTA officials stated that the Second Avenue Subway cost as much as it did only because of the complex underground infrastructure in Manhattan, as well as the fact that the New York City Subway operates 24/7 service.

Artwork
For Phase 1 of the Second Avenue Subway, four contemporary artists were chosen to design artwork for the 96th, 86th, 72nd, and 63rd Street stations. The project consisted of four permanent installations: Blueprint for a Landscape by Sarah Sze at 96th Street; Subway Portraits by Chuck Close at 86th Street; Perfect Strangers by Vik Muniz at 72nd Street; and Elevated by Jean Shin at 63rd Street. These public artworks were sponsored and commissioned as part of the MTA Arts & Design program.

Service patterns

Routes 

The opening of Phase 1 extended Q service to 96th Street from its former terminal at 57th Street. The Q service has a rush-hour service frequency of 7 to 10 trains per hour; by contrast, the IRT Lexington Avenue Line's express tracks have an estimated rush-hour frequency of 30 trains per hour, or one train approximately every 2 minutes in each direction. As part of the 2004 Final Environmental Impact Study (FEIS) for the line, Q service was planned to have a frequency of 14 trains per hour during rush hours, but this was revised due to MTA schedule changes. A few rush hour N trains that formerly short-turned at 57th Street began to run to 96th Street on January 3, 2017; the northbound trips are labeled as Q trains via the Sea Beach Line to reduce passenger confusion. Starting on November 6, 2017, one northbound R train has served the line during weekday mornings, boosting service. From April 2019 to April 2020, weekend and evening M service was also diverted on the Second Avenue Subway to accommodate extra passengers during the 14th Street Tunnel shutdown.

In Phase 2, all current services will be extended to 125th Street and Lexington Avenue. As part of the 2004 FEIS, it was planned for Q service to be increased to 19 trains per hour to accommodate the projected increase in ridership. In order to allow for the construction of Phase 3, bellmouths have been constructed at the turnoff to the BMT 63rd Street Line.

Future full-length designation 

When the construction of Phase 3 is completed, a new T service will operate from Harlem–125th Street to Houston Street. After Phase 4 opens, T service will run the full length of the line, from Harlem–125th Street to Hanover Square. T service is planned to operate at a frequency of 14 trains per hour during rush hours, with the combined frequency north of 72nd Street with Q service being 28 trains per hour. With the opening of Phase 3, the frequency of Q service is planned to be reduced from 19 to 14 trains per hour.

The MTA decided to designate the future service with the letter T, in part because:

 H is the Rockaway Park Shuttle's internal route designator, which has occasionally been used publicly, most notably from 1986–93 and again in 2012–13 following Hurricane Sandy.
 The letters I and O are too easily confused with the numbers 1 and 0, respectively.
 The letter K was used until the late 1980s to denote services on the IND Eighth Avenue Line, and earlier on the BMT Jamaica Line, and thus is not preferred.
 The letters P, U and Y are more easily confused with common words.
 The letter V was in use at the time (and until 2010) to denote services on the IND Sixth Avenue Line and IND Queens Boulevard Line.

The Ts route emblem is colored  (hex triplet #00ADD0, which could also be considered robin's egg blue or teal) because the color had also been used for the JFK Express in the past. In 2011, turquoise was considered "the color of the year", and at the time of the color's selection in the 2000s, it was also considered a very upscale color.

Station listing 
Three stations are part of Phase 1, which opened on January 1, 2017. Three more are planned for Phase 2 (including one transfer to an existing line); six more in Phase 3 (including up to four transfers); and four more in Phase 4 (including one transfer).

See also 

 Fulton Center
 Lower Manhattan–Jamaica/JFK Transportation Project
 Transportation in New York City

References 
Informational notes

Citations

Further reading

External links 

 
 Second Avenue Subway – Phase 2
 
 Official MTA Flickr webpage
 Second Avenue Subway: A New York Transit Museum online exhibit
 
 New York's Second Ave Subway: A Century in Maps

2nd Avenue
2nd Avenue Subway
New York City Subway projects
Program for Action
2nd Avenue
Second Avenue (Manhattan)